The African Groundnut Council is an Intergovernmental organization designed to promote groundnuts produced in the countries of the Gambia, Mali, Niger, Senegal, the Sudan and Nigeria.

History
Founded in June 1964, the AGC was based in Lagos, Nigeria, from its founding until 2005, when it moved to Kano. It moved in 2005 due to lobbying by the Groundnut Farmers Association of Nigeria. The first executive secretary of the organization was Jacques Diouf.

The setting up of AGC was intended to promote economic cooperation and discuss common problems such as commodity pricing among African producers, it also acts as a common marketing, research and publicity body for its members. Governments of producing countries at the turn of independence received a significant percentage of national income and foreign exchange receipts from groundnut. The AGC was initiated to help establish cooperative action to stabilise prices and advance producer interest in the international commodity markets.

References

External links
 Official home page

Organizations established in 1964
International organizations based in Africa
Agricultural organizations based in Nigeria
1964 establishments in Nigeria
Organizations based in Lagos
Organizations based in Kano
Agriculture in the Gambia
Agriculture in Senegal
Agriculture in Niger
Agriculture in Sudan
Agriculture in Mali
Peanut production